Estadio del Ejército, officially Estadio Coronel Guillermo Reyes Gramajo was a football stadium located in Guatemala City, the capital of Guatemala. The stadium was built in 1950 and was the home of Aurora F.C. It was demolished in late 2021 as a replacement for a shopping center.

The stadium's maximum seating capacity is 13,000 people. It was also formerly also used for rugby and served as the home of the Guatemala Killers from 1995–2003.

External links
 Photos and some information

References
World Stadiums 

Del Ejercito
Sport in Guatemala City